Grace is a British television crime drama series, based in the English city of Brighton & Hove, that stars John Simm in the title role of DSU Roy Grace, a dogged detective who, haunted by the disappearance of his wife some years previously, uses his interests in the paranormal to help him solve cases. 

The series, based on the bestselling novels by novelist Peter James, was brought to life by acclaimed screenwriter Russell Lewis, with a pair of films, comprising the novels Dead Simple and Looking Good Dead, filmed in 2020 for broadcast in 2021. Dead Simple, broadcast in March 2021, attracted an estimated 7.2m viewers, which made it the fifth-most-watched programme for the week of 8–14 March, according to BARB.

Following strong viewing figures for the opening episode, a second series of three films was then commissioned in 2021, for broadcast in 2022. A third series has subsequently been commissioned for 2023, with filming to begin in August 2022.

Production
The first series was predominently filmed in Brighton and Hove; however, location filming also took place in Sussex, particularly around the border between East and West Sussex. The first episode, Dead Simple, was shifted forward in the schedules by a week, originally set to air on March 21. This was to avoid a clash with the launch of the sixth series of the BBC's Line of Duty. Subsequently, this led to the decision to postpone Looking Good Dead until a later date. Subsequently, when the first series aired in the United States, it meant that Looking Good Dead was available to stream for more than a year before its British broadcast.

In May 2021, Grace was commissioned for a second series. Filming began in September 2021 in the West Sussex town of Burgess Hill. The second series adapts the next three novels in the Grace series, Not Dead Enough, Dead Man's Footsteps and Dead Tomorrow. Broadcast of the second series commenced in the UK on 24 April 2022, with Looking Good Dead as the opening episode. 

A third series was subsequently commissioned in May 2022, with the novels Dead Like You, Dead Man's Grip and Not Dead Yet set to be adapted. For this series, Russell Lewis will step down as showrunner and principal writer, with former Whitechapel writers Ben Court & Caroline Ip to pen two episodes, and prolific screenwriter Ed Whitmore to pen the other. The series will also feature a new ACC, following the departure of Rakie Ayola at the end of series two.

Cast
 John Simm as DSI Roy Grace
 Richie Campbell as DS Glenn Branson
 Rakie Ayola as ACC Alison Vosper (Series 1—2) 
 Craig Parkinson as DS Norman Potting
 Laura Elphinstone as DS Bella Moy
 Brad Morrison as DC Nick Nicholl
 Omaka Amafor as DC Emma-Jayne Boutwood (Series 1)
 Zoe Tapper as Cleo Moray (Series 2—)
 Clare Calbraith as Sandy Grace (Series 2—)
 Adrian Rawlins as Harry Frame (Series 1)

Episodes

Series 1 (2021)

Series 2 (2022)

Series 3 (2023)

Home Media

References

External links
 
 

2020s British crime drama television series
2020s British mystery television series
2021 British television series debuts
English-language television shows
ITV television dramas
Television series by ITV Studios
Television shows set in Sussex